Duke of Baena is a hereditary title in the Peerage of Spain, accompanied by the dignity of Grandee and granted in 1566 by Philip II to Gonzalo Fernández de Córdoba II, who was the 7th Lord of Baena, 5th Count of Cabra and 3rd Duke of Sessa, Santángelo, Terranova, Andría and Montalto.

The name makes reference to the town of Baena in the province of Córdoba.

Dukes of Baena (1566)

Gonzalo Fernández de Córdoba y Fernández de Córdoba, 1st Duke of Baena
Francisca Fernández de Córdoba y Fernández de Córdoba, 2nd Duchess of Baena
Antonio Fernández de Córdoba y Cardona, 3rd Duke of Baena
Luis Fernández de Córdoba y Aragón, 4th Duke of Baena
Antonio Fernández de Córdoba y Rojas, 5th Duke of Baena
Francisco Fernández de Córdoba y Pimentel, 6th Duke of Baena
Félix Fernández de Córdoba y Cardona, 7th Duke of Baena
Francisco Fernández de Córdoba y Aragón, 8th Duke of Baena
Ventura Francisca Fernández de Córdoba y Aragón, 9th Duchess of Baena
Ventura Osorio de Moscoso y Fernández de Córdoba, 10th Duke of Baena
Vicente Joaquín Osorio de Moscoso y Guzmán, 11th Duke of Baena
Vicente Pío Osorio de Moscoso y Álvarez de Toledo, 12th Duke of Baena
Vicente Pío Osorio de Moscoso y Ponce de León, 13th Duke of Baena
María Rosalía Osorio de Moscoso y Carvajal, 14th Duchess of Baena
Mariano Ruiz de Arana y Osorio de Moscoso, 15th Duke of Baena
José María Ruiz de Arana y Baüer, 16th Duke of Baena
José María Ruiz de Arana y Montalvo, 17th Duke of Baena
María Cristina Ruiz de Arana y Marone-Cinzano, 18th Duchess of Baena

See also
List of dukes in the peerage of Spain
List of current Grandees of Spain

References 

Dukedoms of Spain
Grandees of Spain
Lists of dukes
Lists of Spanish nobility